Robert Matano is a former Kenyan footballer, and currently the head coach at Harambee Stars side Kenya

Matano is a four-time Kenyan Premier League winning coach having won the title with Sofapaka F.C. on their debut season in 2009, and with Tusker F.C. in the 2012, 2020–21, and 2021–22 seasons.

Career

Matano was a defender who turned out for Abeingo, Nakuru Youth Olympic, Hakati FC, Kenatco FC then AFC Leopards. 

After ten years of playing, he moved to coaching starting out at Pumwani Sportif in 1986. The list of teams he coached thereafter till the year 2000 includes; Kenya Pipeline, Shamako Babes, Bayer East Africa, Safari Park, Timsales, Kimbo FC, and Re-Union. 

From the year 2005, he coached topflight sides including promoted World Hope, Sofapaka, AFC Leopards, Ulinzi Stars, and Tusker over two stints. He was named the coach of the month in June 2021, and was picked as the coach of the year at the close of the 2020–21 season to add on to a similar award earned in 2009.

Kenya National team

Matano made it to the national fold as an assistant coach to the Kenya National team in 2006.

Honours
World Hope
 FKF President's Cup: 2005
Sofapaka
 Kenyan Premier League: 2009
Tusker
 Kenyan Premier League: 2012, 2020–21, 2021–22
 Kenyan Super Cup: 2021–22
AFC Leopards
 FKF President's Cup: 2017
Individual
  Coach of the Year: 2009, 2020–21
  Coach of the Month: June 2021

References

1964 births
Living people
Kenyan footballers
Kenyan football managers
A.F.C. Leopards managers